The Tao of Mad Phat (subtitled "Fringe Zones") is an album by saxophonist Steve Coleman and his band Five Elements recorded in 1993 and released on the Novus label.

Reception
The Allmusic review by Don Snowden awarded the album 4½ stars, stating, "the very organic quality of the music on The Tao of Mad Phat is the true measure of how successfully Coleman and his collaborators have extended the tradition in innovative new directions grounded in modern rhythms".

Track listing
All compositions by Steve Coleman except as indicated
 "The Tao of Mad Phat" – 15:29
 "Alt-Shift=Return" – 7:09
 "Collective Meditations I (Suite): Changing of the Guard" – 3:56
 "Collective Meditations I (Suite): Guards on the Train" – 3:06
 "Collective Meditations I (Suite): Relax Your Guard" – 0:36
 "Collective Meditations I (Suite): All the Guards There Are" – 2:10
 "Collective Meditations I (Suite): Enter the Rhythm (People)" – 4:04
 "Incantation" – 3:56
 "Laid Back Schematics" – 8:14
 "Polymaid Nomads" – 10:36
 "Little Girl on Fire" (Bunky Green/Steve Coleman) – 16:32

Personnel
 Steve Coleman – alto saxophone, piano, vocals
 Andy Milne – keyboards (except tracks 2, 10)
 David Gilmore – guitar (exc. track 10)
 Reggie Washington – bass guitar (exc. track 10)
 Gene Lake – drums
 Roy Hargrove – trumpet (track 10)
 Josh Roseman – trombone (track 10)
 Matt Garrison – bass guitar (track 10)
 Kenny Davis – acoustic bass (tracks 8, 10)
 Junior Wedderburn – percussion (tracks 8, 10)

References 

1993 albums
Steve Coleman albums
Novus Records albums